The Scout and Guide movement in Madagascar is served by
 Skotisma Zazavavy eto Madagasikara, member of the World Association of Girl Guides and Girl Scouts
 Firaisan'ny Skotisma eto Madagasikara, member of the World Organization of the Scout Movement, and which includes three National Scout Associations:
Antilin'i Madagasikara (Catholic, boys only)
 Kiadin'i Madagasikara (interreligious, coeducational)
 Tily eto Madagasikara (Protestant, boys only)

See also